The Venice Festival of Contemporary Music (Italian: Festival Internazionale di Musica Contemporanea della Biennale di Venezia) was founded in 1930 as an adjunct of the older Venice Biennale festival. Some works by Prokofiev and Stravinsky were premiered at the festival. Among composers featured in the first year were William Walton, Manuel De Falla, Zoltán Kodály, Ernest Bloch, Ferruccio Busoni, Arthur Honegger, and Paul Hindemith. Excluding interruptions in World War II, the festival has continued to the present.

External links
Official website

References

Music in Venice
Venice Biennale
1930 establishments in Italy